The 2008–09 Ukrainian Premier League youth championship season is a competition between the U-21 youth teams of Ukrainian Premier League clubs. The competition has reorganized from the last season by transitioning to age restricted competition under complete administration of the newly established Ukrainian Premier League.

The events in the senior leagues during the 2007-08 season saw Naftovyk Reserves and Zakarpattia Reserves all relegated and replaced by the promoted teams Illichivets Mariupol Reserves and Lviv Reserves.

Final standings

Top scorers

See also
2008–09 Ukrainian Premier League

References

External links
Молодежное первенство. Результаты, турнирная таблица 
League Table at Metalurh Zaporizhya Official Website 
Молодіжна першість Dynamo Kyiv site
СЕЗОН 2008/2009. Молодіжна першість Karpaty Lviv site 
Ukrainian Premier League Reserves - Ukrainiansoccer.net 

Reser
Ukrainian Premier Reserve League seasons